Phytoecia orientis is a species of beetle in the family Cerambycidae. It was described by Per Olof Christopher Aurivillius in 1908.

Subspecies
 Phytoecia orientis orientis (Aurivillius, 1908)
 Phytoecia orientis medionigripennis Breuning, 1961
 Phytoecia orientis camerunica Breuning, 1977
 Phytoecia orientis togolana Téocchi & Sudre, 2003

References

Phytoecia
Beetles described in 1908